Trechus ilgazensis is a species of ground beetle in the subfamily Trechinae. It was described by Donabauer in 2004.

References

ilgazensis
Beetles described in 2004